Christine Perfect is the eponymous debut solo album of former Chicken Shack keyboardist and singer Christine Perfect (later known as Christine McVie). The album was released just after Perfect had left Chicken Shack, but before she joined Fleetwood Mac. It contained the Etta James song "I'd Rather Go Blind", which had earlier been a hit single for Chicken Shack. Since both Chicken Shack and Perfect were on the same record label, Blue Horizon, the exact same Chicken Shack recording of "I'd Rather Go Blind" was included on her solo album. Most of the members of Chicken Shack also participated throughout the recording of the other tracks on Perfect's solo album.

Released in 1970, the album was originally meant to be titled I'm on My Way as evidenced on copies of the single "I'm Too Far Gone (To Turn Around)". It was re-released in 1976 as The Legendary Christine Perfect Album.

This entire album (with the exception of "I'd rather Go Blind") and the rest of the Christine Perfect sessions while on the Blue Horizon label were made available on the CD compilation Christine Perfect - The Complete Blue Horizon Sessions (2008). This compilation included an album outtake "Tell Me You Need Me" written by Perfect. The compilation also included three tracks recorded on November 24, 1969, for the BBC Dave Lee Travis Sunday Show. "Hey Baby" (originally recorded with Chicken Shack during the O.K. Ken? sessions), "It's You I Miss" and "Gone Into the Sun". These recordings for the BBC were made while finishing the debut solo album and therefore were aired before the albums release in 1970.

Since "I'd Rather Go Blind" was actually a Chicken Shack single that was later included on Perfect's debut solo album, the track was made available only on the Chicken Shack CD compilation Chicken Shack - The Complete Blue Horizon Sessions (2007)

Track listing

Personnel 
 Christine Perfect – vocals, keyboards
 Top Topham, Rick Hayward – guitar
 Martin Dunsford – bass guitar
 Chris Harding – drums
 John Bennett, Derek Wadsworth, Terry Noonan – arrangements
 Danny Kirwan – guitar (7)
 John McVie – bass guitar (7)
 Stan Webb – guitar (6)
 Andy Silvester – bass guitar (5, 6)
 Dave Bidwell – drums (6)

Release
 
 CD	Christine Perfect Sony Music Distribution	 1995
 CD	Christine Perfect Sony Music Distribution	 2005
 LP	The Legendary Christine Perfect Album [Sire] CBS Records / Sire	 2008
 Digi	Christine Perfect [UK] Blue Horizon (record label)	 2011

References 

1970 debut albums
Christine McVie albums
Albums produced by Mike Vernon (record producer)
Blue Horizon Records albums
Albums arranged by Derek Wadsworth